Rahimabad District is a district (bakhsh) in Rudsar County, Gilan Province, Iran.  The
sole city in Rahimabad District, also called Rahimabad, is located west of the Caspian Sea at 35° 22' 54" North, 45° 7' 28" East, and lies at an altitude of 4,268 feet (1300 meters) according to Maplandia.com.  At the 2006 census, its population was 27,653, in 7,820 families.  The District has one city: Rahimabad. The District has four rural districts (dehestan): Eshkevar-e Sofla Rural District, Rahimabad Rural District, Shuil Rural District, and Siyarastaq Yeylaq Rural District.

A large earthquake struck the Rahimabad District November 28, 1933.  The 6.3-Richter magnitude earthquake is reported to have resulted in at least four deaths, as well as numerous injuries.

References 

Rudsar County
Districts of Gilan Province